Brody Brown is an American songwriter, producer, and multi-instrumentalist.  The winner of eight Grammy Awards, and a member of the songwriting and production team 1500 or Nothin',  he has collaborated with Bruno Mars since 2008. Brown has also worked with artists including Nipsey Hussle, CeeLo Green, Kesha, Adele. Lukas Graham, Ed Sheeran, Snoop Dogg & Wiz Khalifa, and Mark Ronson.

Early life
Brown was born in  Compton, California. Growing up, he listened to the  jazz his mother played during the week and the gospel she played on Sundays.  As a child, he taught himself to read music and play the drums, bass, guitar and piano.  In junior high school, in addition to playing with the school band, he played with rock, salsa, and jazz bands.  He also performed regularly at local churches.

Brown was a member of The Crips. He was shot at and jailed as a teenager. In a 2016 interview he said that music "kept him from becoming another statistic in a hard neighborhood."

Career
Brown joined 1500 or Nothin' in 2003, and prior to dropping out of high school in 2005, he began writing and playing with Bobby Valentino, who he met through a mutual friend. At 17, he signed a publishing deal with Steve Lindsey, a publishing executive who had also signed Mike Elizondo, Kara DioGuardi, J.R. Rotem, and Mars, among others. Lindsey showed Brown and fellow songwriters Mars and Jeff Bhasker (who Mars met through Mike Lynn) the ins and outs of writing pop music and acted as a mentor, helping them to hone their craft.

Brown subsequently co-wrote tracks with Mars for his debut album, Doo-Wops & Hooligans (2010), Unorthodox Jukebox (2012), 24k Magic (2016), and Silk Sonic's An Evening with Silk Sonic. Other songs he co-wrote with Mars include "Grenade," which was nominated for six Grammy Awards in 2011, and the 24K Magic title track, "That's What I Like," which in 2017 won the Grammy Award for Song of the Year, Best R&B Song, and Best R&B Performance. 24K Magic also won Album of the Year. He and Mars additionally worked together on tracks for other artists, including Adele's "All I Ask", from 25 (2015), Snoop Dogg & Wiz Khalifa's "Young, Wild, & Free",  Mark Ronson's "Feel Right" and CeeLo Green's "Fuck You."

Brown was a co-writer on Silk Sonic's "Leave the Door Open", which won four 2022 Grammy Awards: Song of the Year, Record of the Year, Best R&B Song, and Best R&B Performance.

Grammy awards
 
|-
!scope="row"|2010
| "Fuck You" (CeeLo Green) || rowspan="2"| Song of the Year || 
| rowspan="10" style="text-align:center;" |
|-
!scope="row"|2011
| "Grenade" (Bruno Mars)||  
|-
!scope="row"| 2012
| "Young, Wild & Free" (Snoop Dogg  Wiz Khalifa and Bruno Mars)|| Best Rap Song||
|-
!scope="row"|2017
|25 (Adele) || rowspan="2"| Album of the Year|| 
|-
!scope="row" rowspan="4"| 2018
|24K Magic (Bruno Mars) ||
|-
| "24K Magic" (Bruno Mars)|| Record of the Year || 
|-
| rowspan="2"| "That's What I Like" (Bruno Mars) || Song of the Year ||
|-
| Best R&B Song ||
|-
!scope="row" rowspan="2"| 2022
| rowspan="2"| "Leave the Door Open" (Silk Sonic)
| Song of the Year
| 
|-
| Best R&B Song
| 
|-
|}

Selected discography

References

External links
 

Living people
Crips
Year of birth missing (living people)